Andrastin A is a farnesyltransferase inhibitor isolate of Penicillium species including Penicillium albocoremium and Penicillium roqueforti. It has been produced bio-synthetically by porting the relevant gene sequence into Aspergillus oryzae.

See also
Satoshi Ōmura

References

Acetate esters
Farnesyltransferase inhibitors